Changyou.com Ltd. operates online games, primarily massively multiplayer online games, in China. Originally a division of Chinese Internet company Sohu, Changyou was spun off and went public in 2009 through a variable interest entity (VIE) structure based in the Cayman Islands. The company claims it was operating independently of Sohu as early as 2007.

Some of its games derive revenue from the sale of virtual goods, and many are licensed rather than developed in-house. Such deals have helped its roster of MMORPGs swell from two in 2009 to nearly a dozen as of 2014.

 2009, its most popular game may have been the MMO Tian Long Ba Bu, which translated means "Novel of Eight Demigods". Some games in its portfolio are available to play outside of China in countries including Malaysia, Taiwan, Thailand,
the United States, and Vietnam.

In 2011, the company purchased nearly 70% of a browser games maker, 7Road.

In 2020, the company was acquired by Sohu and all Changyou.com stock was delisted from NASDAQ.

See also
Blade Wars
Dragon Oath
Shadowbane
Zentia

References

External links

Chinese companies established in 2007
Video game companies established in 2007
Companies formerly listed on the Nasdaq
Video game companies of China
Video game development companies